Colcarteria is a genus of Australian intertidal spiders that was first described by Michael R. Gray in 1992.  it contains only three species: C. carrai, C. kempseyi, and C. yessabah.

References

Araneomorphae genera
Desidae
Spiders of Australia